Tiriara is a lake in the south of the island of Mangaia in the Cook Islands. Though the largest freshwater lake in the Cook Islands, poor pollution management and agricultural processes in the area have put the biodiversity of the lake at risk.

See also 
 List of lakes in the Cook Islands

References

Sources https://web.archive.org/web/20120128032425/http://www.seacology.org/projects/individualprojects/COOKISLANDS_lake2001.htm

Lakes of the Cook Islands
Mangaia